Tha Chang railway station is a railway station located in Tha Chang Subdistrict, Chaloem Phra Kiat District, Nakhon Ratchasima Province.

References 

Railway stations in Thailand
Nakhon Ratchasima province